Hindustan Zinc Limited Ground is a cricket ground in Visakhapatnam, Andhra Pradesh. It is owned by Hindustan Zinc Limited and was established in 2002.
In 2007, the hosted five Inter-State T20 Championship matches since then it has been specialist ground for Twenty20 cricket. 	
In 2009, the hosted four Syed Mushtaq Ali Trophy matches since the ground was not being used for top level cricket.
The ground is a regular host for under-age cricket in the state.

References

External links 

 cricketarchive
 cricinfo
 Hindustan Zinc Limited

Cricket grounds in Andhra Pradesh
Multi-purpose stadiums in India
Sport in Visakhapatnam
Sports venues completed in 2002
2002 establishments in Andhra Pradesh
Sports venues in Visakhapatnam